Loras Joseph Watters (October 14, 1915 – March 30, 2009) was an American bishop of the Catholic Church. He served as an auxiliary bishop in the Archdiocese of Dubuque from 1965 to 1969, and as the fifth Bishop of Winona from 1969 to 1986.

Biography

Early life 
Loras Watters was born in Dubuque, Iowa, the son of Martin and Carolyn (Sisler) Watters. He was a sick child at birth and he and his mother spent an extended period of time in the hospital. He received his first name from the sister who baptized him in the hospital, Sr. Loras, "much to his mother's chagrin." Watters received his early education at St. Raphael’s Cathedral School in Dubuque and Loras Academy before completing his undergraduate degree at Columbia College in Dubuque.

Watters studied for the priesthood at the Pontifical North American College and the Pontifical Gregorian University in Rome before World War II closed the school. He completed his studies at Theological College at The Catholic University of America in Washington, D.C.

Priesthood 
Watters was ordained a priest in the Archdiocese of Dubuque on June 7, 1941, by Archbishop Francis Beckman in St. Raphael's Cathedral. He served as the assistant pastor at St. Martin's Parish in Cascade, Iowa, from 1941 to 1944. He then served on the faculty of Loras Academy in Dubuque from 1944 to 1946. 

Watters returned to Catholic University for post-graduate work before returning to Loras Academy briefly as principal. He then returned to Catholic University where he earned a doctorate in education. Upon returning to Dubuque he served on the faculty of Loras College in the Education Department from 1954 to 1956. 

Watters returned to Rome in 1956 where he served as spiritual director at the Pontifical North American College until 1960. He was named a papal chamberlain by Pope Pius XII and then a domestic prelate by Pope John XXIII during these years. After he returned to Iowa, Watters became the director of the North American Martyrs Retreat House in Cedar Falls.

Auxiliary Bishop of Dubuque
Watters was appointed titular bishop of Fidoloma and auxiliary bishop of the Diocese of Dubuque by Pope Paul VI on June 21, 1965. He was consecrated a bishop by Archbishop Egidio Vagnozzi on August 26, 1965, in St. Raphael's Cathedral. Archbishop James Byrne and Bishop James Casey were the co-consecrators. Watters attended the fourth session on the Second Vatican Council (Vatican II) in Rome. During the time he served as auxiliary bishop, Waters also served as the vicar general and superintendent of schools for the archdiocese and as the pastor of Nativity Parish in Dubuque.

Bishop of Winona
On January 8, 1969, Paul VI appointed Watters as the fifth bishop of the Diocese of Winona; he was installed on March 13, 1969. Watters led the diocese in the years after Vatican II. He promulgated the document, "The Church in the Diocese of Winona," which described the local Church and the roles of the clergy, religious, and the laity. He initiated the Diocesan Pastoral Council, which provided a pastoral leadership role for the laity in the Church. From 1972 to 1974, Watters served as the  Chairman of the Bishops' Committee on Priestly Formation for the National Conference of Catholic Bishops.

Watters led the diocese in a spiritual renewal program called RENEW beginning in 1984, which encouraged the laity to participate in the life of their parish. This emphasis on the role of lay people helped in the years Watters was the bishop and after he resigned as the number of priests in diocese declined. He also established the Diocesan Tribunal, the Diocesan Finance Office, and reorganized the diocese of Winona into deaneries. During his years as bishop, he resided in a three-room apartment at the Diocesan Pastoral Center.

Retirement and legacy
Watters remained as the Bishop of Winona until his retirement on his 71st birthday in 1986. He initially moved to St. Mary's College in Winona where he taught part-time and served as chaplain to the Brothers. He moved briefly to Pacific Grove, California to be near his sisters before returning to Winona in 2003 and resided at Callista Court at St. Anne's Extended Healthcare. 

Loras Watters died in Winona on March 30, 2009 at age 93. His funeral was held in the Cathedral of the Sacred Heart and he was buried in St. Mary's Cemetery in Winona.

References

External links
Dubuque Diocese
Winona Diocese

Episcopal succession

20th-century Roman Catholic bishops in the United States
Roman Catholic bishops of Winona
Roman Catholic Archdiocese of Dubuque
Participants in the Second Vatican Council
People from Dubuque, Iowa
1915 births
2009 deaths
Religious leaders from Iowa
Catholics from Iowa
Loras College alumni
Catholic University of America alumni
Loras College faculty